Solar Igniter is the second album from jazz band Modereko, a side project of drummer John Molo (of Bruce Hornsby and the Range), released in 2003.  The album features an appearance by Keller Williams, who in addition to performing on the album, also helped to write some of the songs.

Track listing
 Seven Heaven 5:01  
 El Kabong 4:58  
 Getaway Float 4:26  
 Huckleberry 5:52  
 Take It Out 3:59  
 35 Rooms 3:27  
 Travel by Balloon 4:39  
 Tronic 2:54  
 Solar Igniter 5:25  
 Snake Charmer 3:59  
 Miracles 4:12  
 Allman Joy 3:37  
 Soul Cheese 5:09  
 Celebrate Your Youth 10:02

Album credits
J. Collier - Bass, Guest Appearance  
Danny Conway - Bass, Group Member  
John D'earth -  Sampling  
Joe Gastwirt -  Mastering  
Tim Kobza -  Bass, Guitar, Vocals, Producer, Group Member  
Rani Laik -  Artwork  
John Molo -  Percussion, Drums, Vocals, Producer, Loops, Group Member  
Zac Rae -  Keyboards, Guest Appearance, Interlude  
Bobby Read Clarinet, Flute, Keyboards, Saxophone, Vocals, Producer, Group Member  
Jimmy Thomas Organ, Synthesizer, Wurlitzer, Group Member  
Keller Williams Vocals, Guest Appearance

References

2003 albums